John James Francis Dempsey (25 September 1919 – 9 September 2006) was an Australian rules footballer who played with South Melbourne in the Victorian Football League (VFL) during the 1940s.

Dempsey made four appearances in the 1941 VFL season but didn't play a single game over the next two years as he was on active service with the Australian Army. He returned to South Melbourne in 1944 and kicked three goals on his first game back, against St Kilda at Junction Oval. A regular member of the team in 1945, Dempsey missed just one game all year and was South Melbourne's ruck-rover in the 1945 VFL Grand Final.

References

External links

1919 births
2006 deaths
Australian rules footballers from Victoria (Australia)
Sydney Swans players
Australian Army personnel of World War II
Australian Army soldiers